The 2017 Charlotte Independence season is the club's third season of existence, and their third in the United Soccer League, the second tier of American soccer.

Competitions

USL

Regular season

Standings 
Eastern Conference

Match results 

All times in Eastern Time.

Playoffs

U.S. Open Cup

References

External links 
 

Charlotte Independence
Charlotte Independence
Charlotte Independence seasons
Charlotte Independence